Shanel Francine Daley (born 25 December 1988) is a Jamaican former cricketer who played as a left-arm medium bowler and left-handed batter. She appeared in 70 One Day Internationals and 68 Twenty20 Internationals for the West Indies between 2008 and 2017. She played domestic cricket for Jamaica, as well as spending one season with Staffordshire.

References

External links

1988 births
Jamaican women cricketers
Living people
Staffordshire women cricketers
West Indian women cricketers
West Indies women One Day International cricketers
West Indies women Twenty20 International cricketers